The 1974 Bulgarian Cup Final was the 34th final of the Bulgarian Cup (in this period the tournament was named Cup of the Soviet Army), and was contested between CSKA Sofia and Levski Sofia on 10 August 1974 at Vasil Levski National Stadium in Sofia. CSKA won the final 2–1 after extra time.

Match

Details

See also
1973–74 A Group

References

Bulgarian Cup finals
PFC CSKA Sofia matches
PFC Levski Sofia matches
Cup Final